Johnny the Walrus is a children's picture book written by American conservative political commentator Matt Walsh. It allegorically compares being transgender to pretending to be a walrus, through the story of a child named Johnny. It was published by DW Books, a division of The Daily Wire.


Summary
In the book, Johnny is a little boy with an imagination who dresses up as a walrus by using spoons as tusks. When "internet people" find out that Johnny enjoys being a walrus, he is forced to decide between being a boy or a walrus, and he is not allowed to change his mind. The "internet people" also pressure Johnny's mother into feeding Johnny worms and taking him to a doctor with a saw, who suggests turning Johnny's hands and feet into fins.

Reception
Johnny the Walrus became the best-selling book in Amazon's LGBTQ+ category before Amazon recategorized it on December 10, 2021, to the Political and Social Commentary category. Walsh called the recategorization "an unconscionable attack on gay rights and a horrific example of homophobia and gay erasure." GLAAD, an LGBT media monitoring organization, had previously called for Amazon to remove the book from its LGBTQ+ category. On the same day, Target removed the book from its online bookstore.

Fox News host Tucker Carlson called the book "hilarious." Conservative news website TheBlaze called the book "an effort to push back against radical gender ideology which defies biological reality." The satirist Andrew Doyle, writing in UnHerd, praised the book for mocking the "indoctrination of the young." LGBT news website PinkNews called the book "hateful" and "transphobic." LGBTQ Nation called the book "anti-transgender" and said that the book mocks transgender youth.

In March 2022, a group called No Hate at Amazon circulated a petition demanding that Amazon stop selling books like Johnny the Walrus and Irreversible Damage and instead set up an oversight board that would allow employees to determine content sold on Amazon. At least 500 people signed the petition, which had been presented to Amazon leadership in the summer of 2021. A spokesperson for The Daily Wire Books praised Amazon for "dismissing demands by its woke employees" and said that Johnny the Walrus had sold "nearly 100,000 copies" on Amazon as of June 2022.

Allegation of plagiarism
On December 11, 2021, media personality Ashley St. Clair accused Walsh of stealing the idea and plot for Johnny the Walrus from her children's book Elephants Are Not Birds, which was published in July 2021.

See also 
 Political satire
 What is a Woman?, an online documentary by Walsh about transgender issues in which he asks the titular question to various people.

References

American picture books
Political satire books
English-language books
Children's books with transgender themes
LGBT-related controversies in literature
Conservative media in the United States
Discrimination against transgender people
2021 children's books